The men's pursuit competition in biathlon at the Vancouver 2010 Olympics was held at Whistler Olympic Park in Whistler, British Columbia on February 16, 2010. It was won by Swedish athlete Björn Ferry, after both Ferry and second place finisher Christoph Sumann of Austria successfully pursued and overtook the leader at the start of the race, France's Vincent Jay.

Competition
The start of the competition was marred by irregularities in how officials released athletes at the beginning of their runs. In pursuit competitions, athlete's start times are staggered by the differences in their times in a previous sprint, in this case the 10km sprint event held on February 14. Thus, officials need to release athletes to begin the event at exact times. Athletes in both the men's and women's pursuit competitions were started earlier and later than their appropriate times, resulting in a number of complaints from coaches and athletes. Officials attempted to correct the errors by making alterations in the final times of competitors. Nonetheless, media reports cited the incident as embarrassing for the International Biathlon Union. Norbert Baier, the chief technical delegate from the IBU at the Games and the official responsible for ensuring that the rules were implemented correctly by officials, called it, "the worst day of my career."

Following the sprint, Vincent Jay of France led the field and started first. Jay would continue to set the pace throughout much of the race. Björn Ferry of Sweden, who started the race in 8th place more than a minute behind Jay, pushed hard through much of the race and finally overtook Jay in the final lap. Following Ferry, Austrian Christoph Sumann also overtook Jay and won the silver medal. Jay held on to third place, beating his closest opponent by less than three seconds at the finish line, and securing the bronze medal. Ferry's victory was the first Olympic biathlon gold medal won by a Swedish athlete in 50 years. Norwegian competitors Emil Hegle Svendsen and Ole Einar Bjørndalen, a five-time Olympic champion, were expected to do well before the race but failed to live up to those expectations. Svendsen missed four shooting targets and Bjørndalen finished nearly a minute behind Ferry.

Confusion and starter errors
Observers and participants reported that several starter errors occurred during the race start.  Competitors Jeremy Teela and Jean-Philippe Leguellec were started too early, before racers who were seeded higher than them.  Teela stated that the early start threw-off his strategy, contributing to his missing two targets in his first two shooting range stops.  Said Teela, "We have a couple more races this week. Hopefully the organizers figure this problem out and they make the races fair."  Starter confusion was reportedly also present during the Women's pursuit earlier that day.  U.S. coach Per Nilsson stated that he had never seen an Olympic biathlon as poorly managed as the February 16 women's race.

Results

See also
Biathlon at the 2010 Winter Paralympics – Men's pursuit

References

External links
2010 Winter Olympics results: Men's 12.5 km Pursuit, from https://web.archive.org/web/20091025194336/http://www.vancouver2010.com/; retrieved 2010-02-15.

Pursuit